Pavel Rassolko (born 29 April 1993) is a Belarusian professional footballer who plays for Molodechno.

References

External links 
 
 

1993 births
Living people
Belarusian footballers
Association football midfielders
FC Luch Minsk (2012) players
FC Baranovichi players
FC Volna Pinsk players
FC Krumkachy Minsk players
FC Naftan Novopolotsk players
FC Molodechno players